Valia (Valentine) Selitsky Allorge (1888–1977) was a Russian-French botanist, phycologist, and bryologist known for studying the flora of the Pyrenees region.  

She was born in the Russian Empire and emigrated to Nice in France before the start of World War I. She studied in Switzerland and then at the University of Paris. At the University of Paris she worked in the lab of Gaston Bonnier. It was also at the University of Paris she met her first husband, C.-L. Gatin, who was a botanist. He was killed as a soldier in the French Army in World War I in 1916.

In 1920 she married Pierre Allorge. He husband was the editor of Revue
Bryologique, which she continued to edit after his death.

References 

1888 births
1977 deaths
University of Paris alumni
French women scientists
20th-century French botanists
Emigrants from the Russian Empire to France